Empress Wenming may refer to:

Wang Yuanji (217–268), empress dowager of the Jin dynasty
Princess Duan (Murong Huang's wife) ( 4th century), empress of Former Yan (the empress title might have been created posthumously)
Empress Dowager Feng (442–490), empress of Northern Wei